The 2022 New Mexico gubernatorial election took place on November 8, 2022, to elect the governor and lieutenant governor of New Mexico. The election coincided with various other federal and state elections. Primary elections were held on June 7.

Incumbent Democratic governor Michelle Lujan Grisham won a second term. She was first elected in 2018 with 57.2% of the vote. Her opponent was Republican Mark Ronchetti, who was also his party's nominee in New Mexico's 2020 U.S. Senate election. This was the first gubernatorial election in New Mexico since 1986 in which the winner was from the same party as the incumbent president.

Democratic primary

Governor

Candidates

Nominated 
 Michelle Lujan Grisham, incumbent governor (2019–present)

Endorsements

Results

Lieutenant governor

Candidates

Nominated 
 Howie Morales, incumbent lieutenant governor (2019–present)

Results

Republican primary

Governor

Candidates

Nominated 
Mark Ronchetti, former KRQE meteorologist and nominee for the U.S. Senate in 2020

Eliminated in primary 
Jay Block, Sandoval County commissioner and retired U.S. Air Force officer
Rebecca Dow, state representative (2017–2023)
Ethel Maharg, Right to Life of New Mexico executive director
Gregory Zanetti, retired U.S. Army National Guard officer and former chair of the Bernalillo County Republican Party

Withdrew 
 Karen Bedonie, businesswoman (running as a Libertarian)
Tim Walsh, former advisor to Governor Gary Johnson and former Lake City, Minnesota city councilman (ran as a Libertarian)
Louie Sanchez, Albuquerque City Councilor (ran for U.S. House)

Declined 

Polling 
Aggregate polls

Results

Lieutenant governor

Candidates

Nominated 
Ant Thornton, aerospace engineer

Eliminated in primary 
Peggy Muller-Aragon, member of the Albuquerque Public Schools Board of Education

Eliminated at convention 
Patrick H. Lyons, former New Mexico Commissioner of Public Lands and former member of the New Mexico Public Regulation Commission
Anastacia Morper, real estate agent
Isabella Solis, Doña Ana County commissioner

Results

Libertarian primary

Governor

Candidates

Nominated 
 Karen Bedonie, businesswoman and candidate for New Mexico's 3rd congressional district in 2020

Eliminated in primary 
 Ginger G. Grider, nominee for Secretary of State of New Mexico in 2018

Withdrew 
Tim Walsh, former advisor to Governor Gary Johnson and former Lake City, Minnesota city councilman
Endorsements

Results

Lieutenant governor 
Travis Sanchez won the Libertarian primary unopposed, but withdrew to become the Libertarian nominee for New Mexico State Auditor. Sanchez was replaced by Efren Gallardo Jr.

Candidates

Declared
Efren Gallardo Jr

Withdrew
 Travis Sanchez, activist

Results

General election

Predictions

Endorsements

Polling 
Aggregate polls

Graphical summary

Michelle Lujan Grisham vs. Jay Block

Michelle Lujan Grisham vs. Rebecca Dow

Michelle Lujan Grisham vs. Ethel Maharg

Michelle Lujan Grisham vs. Gregory Zanetti

Michelle Lujan Grisham vs. generic Republican

Debates

Results

Notes 

Partisan clients

References

External links 
Official campaign websites
 Karen Bedonie (L) for Governor
Michelle Lujan Grisham (D) for Governor
 Mark Ronchetti (R) for Governor

2022
New Mexico
Gubernatorial